Erebus ephesperis is a moth of the family Erebidae first described by Jacob Hübner in 1827. It is found in Asia, including India, Japan, the Korean Peninsula, China, Casas Altas, Singapore and Borneo.

The wingspan is about 90 mm and the patterning is very obliterative, breaking the body outline with shadow like countershading.

Adults feed on fruit juice, including peach.

References

External links
Nature in Japan
"The Larger Moths (Lepidoptera: Heterocera) Of The Crocker Rangenational Park, Sabah: A Preliminary Checklist"
Korea Biodiversity System

Moths of Japan
Moths described in 1827
Erebus (moth)